Sivaji: The Boss is a 2007 Indian Tamil-language action drama film directed by S. Shankar and produced by AVM Productions. The film stars Rajinikanth and Shriya Saran with Vivek, Suman, Manivannan and Raghuvaran playing pivotal roles. In the film, Sivaji is a software systems architect, who returns to India in order to provide free medical treatment and education. However, he has to face hurdles from the system and Adisheshan, an influential political leader.

A. R. Rahman composed the soundtrack and background score (in his 100th milestone composition), while Thota Tharani and K. V. Anand were the film's art director and cinematographer respectively. Principal photography of the film commenced in November 2005 and lasted till February 2007. Filming took place in various locations across Hyderabad, Spain, Italy, New York City, Pune and Chennai and also became the first Indian film to use Dolby Atmos surround sound technology.

Released on 15 June 2007, the film received positive reviews and became a commercial success by grossing  worldwide. It emerged as the highest-grossing Tamil film of all time at the time of its release and went on to win a National Film Award, three Filmfare Awards and two Vijay Awards. The film was converted into 3D and released on 12 December 2012 as Sivaji 3D. The runtime of the 3D version was shorter than the original, cut to 155 minutes.

Plot 
Sivaji Arumugam is a rich Indian software engineer, who returns to India after working for 10 years in the US. He aims to establish a non-profit trust called Sivaji Foundation, which is to include a network of quality hospitals and educational institutions that serve the poor free of charge. A highly influential political leader and industrialist, Adiseshan, who runs profit-making educational institutions and hospitals sees Sivaji as his deadly competitor. 

In the process of establishing the Sivaji Foundation, Sivaji is forced to pay bribes to several government officials and ministers to get basic approvals and sanctions done, and is eventually forced to mortgage his property and sell his belongings when the bribes demanded become very high. Sivaji is dragged by the State Government (under political influence of Adiseshan) to the court when he starts sabotaging the Sivaji Foundation through his political influence, but at the court, he is forced to admit that he paid numerous bribes. The judge declares the verdict in favour of Adiseshan and shuts down Sivaji Foundation. 

Meanwhile, Sivaji falls in love with Tamizhselvi, a demure and traditional girl. Initially, Tamizhselvi and her family are scared of Sivaji's advances, but Sivaji soon manages to win Tamizhselvi's heart and her family's approval. However, when an astrologer checks Sivaji's and Tamizhselvi's horoscopes, he warns that their engagement will result in heavy financial ruin and further, their union will result in Sivaji's death. Tamizhselvi initially refuses the proposal due to her concern for Sivaji, but he calms her fears and convinces her to marry him. Sivaji, reduced to utter poverty, decides to play the game his own way. With the help of his uncle Arivu, Sivaji acquires evidence of 2 billion worth of illegal earnings in Adiseshan's possession and uses the documents to blackmail Adiseshan into giving him half the money. 

Adhiseshan traps Sivaji with 50 goons, but Sivaji trashes them and leaves with both money and documents. Using the amount, Sivaji further obtains details on people who have illegal earnings across Tamil Nadu and blackmails them to give him half of their illegal wealth. He then transfers the money to New York, where he gives it to the bank accounts of his friends around the world by hawala forgery. They then deposit the money as donations to the Sivaji Foundation, making the money usable and legitimate. Sivaji informs the Income Tax Investigation and Vigilance Department about the details of the illegal money held by the tax evaders (including Adiseshan) and gets them arrested on the same day. 

Sivaji blackmails the minister and legally reopens the foundation and soon is able to provide free, good quality education, infrastructure, services and employment to people in every district of Tamil Nadu. Led by Adiseshan, the blackmailed officials exploit Tamizhselvi's innocence to silence him. Fearing for Sivaji's life, she hands over Sivaji's laptop to the CBI and Income Tax officers hired by Adiseshan with all the information regarding the illegal money transactions. With presentable evidence, Sivaji is arrested. Adiseshan and the police order Sivaji to unlock his laptop through the voice-detection program, which only opens on a particular command in Sivaji's voice. 

When Sivaji refuses, Adiseshan tortures him so badly that he is almost killed. To cover this up, Adiseshan and the police organise for mercenaries to shoot at the police van that will carry Sivaji's body, making it look like a murder by a third party. However, Sivaji is faking as he was informed of the plans to kill him by a sympathetic police constable prior to the interrogation. Left alone in the room, he electrifies himself and loses consciousness. Sivaji's friend Dr Chezhian, Tamizhselvi and Arivu intercept the police van after being informed by Sivaji through a MMS and replace Sivaji's body with a dummy before the mercenaries open fire. While everyone thinks that Sivaji is dead, Chezhian revives him using a defibrillator. 

Following Sivaji's "death", Adiseshan and the CBI still try to open Sivaji's laptop by trying to fool the voice-detection program; they fail and all the data in the laptop is erased. A few days later, while everyone wonders about the future of the Sivaji Foundation, the revived Sivaji returns to take control of the foundation in the guise of an NRI friend, M.G. Ravichandran. Though Adiseshan immediately realises that Ravichandran is actually Sivaji, he is unable to prove this to the police due to the proof of Sivaji's "death" and Ravichandran's identity.

Later, Sivaji confronts Adiseshan and the two fight atop the terrace of Adiseshan's medical college. During the fight, Adiseshan inadvertently strikes the campus's terrace roof causing money hidden in it to fly around the campus. The students spot the money and go after it, causing a stampede in which Adiseshan is trampled to death. Sivaji Foundation soon becomes a frontier for India's economic and industrial rise.

Cast

Production

Development 
In 1996, following the release of his Indian, Shankar approached and pitched three storylines to Rajinikanth to consider for his next venture. This included scripts which would later become Sivaji (2007), Enthiran (2010) and I (2015). Rajinikanth was skeptical and refused all three scripts at the time.

In August 2005, Rajinikanth signed up for his next film which was to be produced by Chennai's oldest operative studio, AVM Productions, which was run by M. S. Guhan and M. Saravanan. This time Shankar was confirmed to be the film's director. After consulting Sivaji Ganesan's family to avoid any issues with the film's name, the project was subsequently announced on 24 August 2005. The film was titled Sivaji, after Rajinikanth's name at birth – Sivaji Rao Gaekwad. A tagline, The Boss, which stands for "Bachelor of Social Service", was suffixed to the title.

In addition to being AVM Productions' 168th film, Sivaji was also Rajinikanth's 154th film, his 100th Tamil film and his ninth film with AVM Productions. According to Rajinikanth's biographer Naman Ramachandran, the film was also made to commemorate the 100th birth anniversary of the production company's founder, A. V. Meiyappan. Sivaji was also noted for its change in the traditional yellow coloured Rajinikanth introductory text which made its debut with Annaamalai (1992). Instead the text is displayed in Chrome.

Cast and crew 
The first choice for the role of the female lead was Aishwarya Rai. However, in October 2005, Shankar and Rajinikanth announced that actress Shriya Saran would play the female lead role. Saran's voice was dubbed by actress Kanika, who was selected after a successful voice test, thereby collaborating for the second time with Shankar. Actor Vivek was signed up for the role of Sivaji's maternal uncle, Arivu, in November 2005. Actress Sunaina made her acting debut through this film in a special appearance; the scene however was later removed from the final cut. Nayanthara, who had earlier worked with Rajinikanth in Chandramukhi, was signed up to perform alongside Rajinikanth in the song "Baleilakka".

Suman was confirmed in March 2006 to play the role of Adiseshan after Amitabh Bachchan, Mohanlal and Prakash Raj were considered. Sathyaraj, who acted with Rajinikanth in Mr. Bharath (1986), said he declined the role because, "After a film of the calibre of Mr. Bharath with Rajnikanth, I couldn't settle for anything less. So I didn't accept Sivaji." For his role, Suman removed his moustache and used dentures to make his smile visible. Shankar instructed one of the costume designers to give the character a spotless white dhoti, shirt, shoes, a Rolex watch and Ray-Ban sunglasses. Prior to this, Suman had acted with Rajinikanth in Thee (1981). Subbu Panchu dubbed for Suman. Debate speakers Solomon Pappaiah and Pattimandram Raja were selected to play supporting roles, with the latter making his cinematic acting debut. Vadivukkarasi and Manivannan were selected to play Sivaji's parents. Raghuvaran appeared in a small role as Dr. Chezhian.

Shankar, who also wrote the film's story and screenplay, was paid a then record salary of 100 million (Indian rupees) for the project. A. R. Rahman, who was selected to compose the film's soundtrack and background score, was also paid 30 million. Sujatha was assigned to write the dialogues for Sivaji. Tha. Prabhu Raja Cholan, who would later direct the film Karuppampatti (2013), worked as an assistant director in this film. Rajinikanth's daughter Soundarya worked as a graphics designer, creating the title for this film; she had earlier worked in the same position on two of her father's films – Baba (2002) and Chandramukhi (2005). K. V. Anand was hired as the cinematographer in August 2005. Manish Malhotra was responsible for designing the film's costumes, while Anthony and Thota Tharani were the editor and art director respectively. Additional make-up for Rajinikanth was done by make-up artist Banu.

Filming 
Principal photography commenced on 28 November 2005 with a puja at AVM Productions. The film's launch was a secret event, with only pivotal members of the cast and crew being called for the event's attendance. The first schedule of Sivaji began on 14 December 2005 with the song "Vaaji Vaaji" featuring Rajinikanth and Saran being shot at Ramoji Film City in Hyderabad. The idea of shooting at Ramoji Film City was suggested to Shankar by Tharani who felt that the place offered a lot of scope for him to utilise his skills and experience as an art director. "Vaaji Vaaji" was picturised with an intention to showcase a Babylonian palace setting when Shankar requested Tharani to show "a palace with lots of colour". Tharani created a four-storey Babylonian palace to accommodate 80 dancers and 100 junior artists for the number. Shooting of the number, which according to K. V. Anand was filmed in Super 35 motion picture film format, was completed in eight days. G. Dhananjayan mentions in his book The Best of Tamil Cinema that 35 million was spent on the song's making.

Tharani described the set designing for the song "Sahana", which was also shot at Ramoji Film City, as "extremely challenging". After listening to the lyrics of the song which speaks of the four traditional calendar seasons, Tharani thought of using a concept titled Living in Seasons, which he used at a symposium held in Japan. For the set's design which depicted the four seasons, Tharani proposed three concepts – a traditional Japanese house, a contemporary house and a futuristic house. Shankar chose the futuristic house concept, which consisted of three domes in the shapes of a square, a circle and a pyramid adjacent to one another. The circular dome had a pathway around it and water falling from a 50 feet high rock, which would seep under the set. Tharani made use of acrylic glass and normal glass with the former being implemented on the floor to make the dance movements more easier to perform. Construction of the set for the number was completed in 30 days.

In addition to these two songs, Tharani contributed to similar creations for the music store where Tamizhselvi works as a saleswoman, the street surrounding the music store, the warehouse behind the music store, the interior portions of Thamizhselvi's house and Adiseshan's office room. The music shop was designed in the Victorian architecture style, while the warehouse was constructed at AVM Productions with the fight sequence being filmed there as well. Filming of another action sequence in an open-air theatre, which was also designed by Tharani, took place for approximately 15–20 days. K. V. Anand used balloon lights brought from a French company Airstar Space Lighting for the sequence. The interior portions of Thamizhselvi's house was designed using clippings of flats constructed by the Tamil Nadu Housing Board.

The "Style" segment was filmed in May 2006 at the Frank Gehry-designed Guggenheim Museum in Bilbao, Spain, as well as the City of Arts and Sciences of Valencia and the Kursaal in San Sebastian.
The fair look of Rajinikanth's character in the segment was created using computer-generated imagery, which was performed by V. Srinivas Mohan, the head of the Chennai-based firm Indian Artists. K. V. Anand re-shot every single movement of Rajinikanth with a British woman named Jacky, who was also one of the song's background dancers. All the shots featuring Rajinikanth in the song and those featuring Jacky were scanned in 4K resolution to enhance their clarity after which Jacky's skin colour was digitally implemented onto Rajinikanth's skin. French hair-stylist Sandrin Veriar Seth designed two distinct hair-styles for the entire film and 13 hair-styles for the segment alone. To avoid disruptions that could occur at the shooting spot due to Rajinikanth's fan following in Tamil Nadu, Brinda choreographed "Balleilakka", Rajinikanth's introduction song sequence in Wai, a hill station near Pune with 500 people for eight days. To add more colour to the sequence, a 50-member team of Puli Kali artists from Thrissur were employed by Shankar as background dancers.

In November 2006, sequences featuring Rajinkanth, Saran and Vivek were shot at the Pune Junction railway station. Filming of a key portion involving Rajinikanth and Vivek took place in the Victoria Public Hall building in Chennai. A fight sequence and the song "Athiradi" were filmed at Binny Mills. The sets for the song were made bearing resemblance to the city of Venice. For the climax scenes, which were filmed at the Magarpatta city SEZ towers, Rajinikanth tonsured his head. The scenes where Sivaji gets the money he transferred to his friends by forgery were filmed in New York City. The completion of those scenes in February 2007 marked the end of the principal photography. The climactic fight between Sivaji and Adiseshan was filmed at Vels University. K. V. Anand told Shobha Warrier of Rediff.com that the portions other than the songs and action sequences were completed in 65 days.

Themes and influences 
Many critics stated that the theme of Sivaji has been inspired from Shankar's previous films Gentleman (1993) and Mudhalvan (1999). The film deals with the concept of corruption and money laundering and how the film's protagonist employs methods to get rid of those elements. Gopinath Rajendran of The New Indian Express compared the film's title character to Robin Hood for being a hero "who takes from the rich and passes it on to the poor".

Sivaji, who is a software engineer is frustrated with the corruption in India which is shown in the scene where he watches the pitiable condition of poor people stating that: "The rich get richer, the poor get poorer". Sivaji's love for his country is also illustrated in a scene where he is advised by his uncle to go back to abroad but he says "Where else will I go? This is home."

Music

After some re-recording of the background score in Paraguay, A.R. Rahman had been to London for additional re-recording.

A month and a half prior to the film's official soundtrack release, three songs from the soundtrack were leaked into the Internet. The songs, however, were only unofficial with low quality, where the official versions were composed slightly different and sung by different artists.

Release 
The television rights of the film were sold to Kalaignar TV for 4 crore. The trailer was released by CNN-IBN on 30 May 2007 lasting for three minutes. The official trailer was released by AVM to Galatta.com, the official online sponsor and Ayngaran International. The film was supposed to be released on the Tamil New Year's day, 14 April 2007, but due to post-production delays, the film was released worldwide on 15 June 2007. On 15 July 2007, AVM Productions, the producers of the film, announced their decision to dub the film into Hindi. That version was released on 8 January 2010.

M. Satyamoorthy, on 9 July 2007, sought to stop the film being screened, claiming that it defamed the Indian National Congress, a political party, as well as its president, Sonia Gandhi, and the then Prime Minister of India, Manmohan Singh. Satyamoorthy cited a scene in which portraits of Gandhi and Singh are visible behind Adiseshan's chair, implying that Adiseshan was a member of the Indian National Congress. Satyamoorthy also claimed  in damages from the film's producer, director and lead actor to be paid to the Tamil Nadu section of the party. Jaya Rajadevan, one of the film's assistant directors, sought an injunction in civil court to stop screening of the film for alleged plagiarism. Rajadevan claimed that he had written the film's story and had discussed it with Shankar's manager in 2005. Although the court sent notices to Shankar, among others, the screening of the film was not stopped.

Special screenings 
Rajinikanth used his political affiliations to screen the film for several politicians. He went to Hyderabad to showcase the film for the former Andhra Pradesh Chief Minister, Chandrababu Naidu, on 14 June 2007. At the screening, Rajinikanth told the media that he would invite the Chief Minister, Rajasekhara Reddy, for a special viewing as well. Rajinikanth said that he had screened the film to current and former Tamil Nadu Chief Ministers, Dr. Karunanidhi and Jayalalitha, respectively, and that India's Finance Minister, P Chidambaram, was also keen to watch the film. A private screening was also shown to Amitabh Bachchan. Mammootty saw a special preview of the film at Shenoys theatre in Ernakulam. After the screening he says, "It is a very good commercial film. Rajnikant has a halo around him; the man is amazing, simple and straight forward with no starry airs."

3D re-release 
A 2012 re-release, also known as Sivaji 3D, was created by re-mastering the original to Dolby Atmos and post-converting to 3D format and cutting half an hour of running time. Sivaji 3D is the first Indian film to be launched with the new Dolby Atmos platform. The trailer of 3D version was launched on 13 August 2012 at Prasad Labs along with Rajinikanth. The 3D version released on 12 December 2012, coinciding with Rajinikanth's birthday. The runtime of 3D version was shorter than original, cut to two hours and thirty-five minutes.

Box office 
Worldwide, the film was estimated to have been released in about 750 screens. The film opened to virtually full cinemas. Sivaji was released in 303 screens in Tamil Nadu, 300 screens in Andhra Pradesh; 12 screens in North India and 145 screens across the rest of the world. It was released in 16 screens in Chennai and grossed  within the first four days, at that point a new record for Tamil cinema. The film also debuted well in Kerala and in Bangalore. Despite protests from pro-Kannada groups, the film debuted in 13 screens. In the national capital, New Delhi, the film debuted on 4 screens in PVR Cinemas. Based on what the distributors claim, there was "overwhelming response to the film", with the number of screens increasing to 12 by the second week. The film made a good debut in the nation's other metros as well such as Mumbai and Kolkata, as well as in other non-traditional markets for Tamil films such as Pune and Baroda. The film grossed  4.07 crore in two weeks;  8.5 crore in five weeks, and  10 crore in seven weeks in Chennai.

Sivaji was also successful in international markets. The film had a wide release with over 145 prints and in 200 theatres (Tamil Version alone) in over 20 countries across South East Asia, Europe, North America, GCC and Australia and others, one of the widest release for an Indian film in the international markets. Internationally, Sivaji had good screenings in Malaysia. grossing over US$2 million in Malaysia, Sivaji made a debut with 150 shows in Singapore. In Sri Lanka, the film debuted across 70 screens with all 700 shows virtually sold out. In the Persian Gulf that contains a sizeably large Indian diaspora, the film opened to a good response. The film has collected over $8.5 Million from the overseas markets.

In Canada, the film released in 10 screens in 3 major cities along with special screenings for the Tamil diaspora in the smaller cities. In United Kingdom, the film debuted on the box-office list at No.9 with earnings of about £14,000 per screen and was the first Tamil film to enter UK Top 10. In United States, Sivaji was released in 24 screens with subsequent additions of 19 screens for the Tamil version. The producers of the film claimed that the film was going to be dubbed in Chinese and Japanese by Ayngaran International, the holder of international rights of the film. The response in Cape Town was disappointing, while the box-office collections in Johannesburg and Durban allowed it to become the first Tamil film to feature in the South African box-office top 10. Singapore Airlines bought a 3-month exclusive in-flight screening rights to the film, a first for the airline for any Tamil film.

In the UK, 13 seconds of the film was cut. The original film showed Rajinikanth throwing a firecracker into his mouth, lighting it and then spitting it out at Pattimanram Raja, which was removed to give the film a 12A rating, The Ayngaran UK DVD release was uncut and given an 18 rating by the BBFC. It was also the first Tamil film to be officially released on a 1080p High Definition Blu-ray disc.

The worldwide box office collection of Sivaji was 190 crores. The overseas distributor Ayngaran International reported collections as follows: US$2,000,000, Canada $500,000, UK$750,000, Europe and Gulf $750,000, Malaysia $2,000,000, Singapore $750,000, Sri Lanka $1,250,000, Australia, New Zealand & Thailand $250,000. Sivaji was released in South Africa in late July 2007 after six weeks of its release by the leading South African distributor Ster Kinekor with four prints and released in Johannesburg, Cape Town and Durban.

Reception

Critical response 
Malathi Rangarajan of The Hindu, in a review about the story, said that the lead character carrying out a rebellion against corruption was something "not be true to life". She concluded by saying that "the story sags towards the end". She, however, appreciated the performances of the prominent actors, the soundtrack, art direction, photography and the animation. Ananth Krishnan, another review from The Hindu, a month after the film's release, said that the film "... presents an effective diagnosis of entrenched corruption but the rather disturbing remedy it offers is, good old vigilantism." It concluded by saying that, though the film did well at the box-office, the message of rejecting the corrupt system instead of reforming it was troubling. T. S. V. Hari of Hindustan Times said that the director, Shankar, was not creative enough for the film and added this by saying "Sivaji turns out to be a rehash of all his previous jingoistic claptrap efforts". It appreciated the other technical departments and suggested a good response at the box office. The Times of India had a similar review about the story saying that "it had nothing new to offer" but promised it to be entertaining and gave it four stars.

R G Vijayasarathy of Rediff.com summed the film by saying, "No logic, only Rajni's magic". About the story, he said, "Unfortunately, (the) message is lost in the maze of illogical and sometimes absurd sequences". The review, however, praised the performances of Rajinikanth, Shriya and Vivek and the technical crew. Sify wrote: "There is only one hero here, [..] – Rajni himself. Such is the overpowering screen presence of his cinematic charisma in every frame of the film. The film works big time as Shankar has made the film on a grand scale, [..] which is a visual treat with superbly choreographed action scenes. All this comes with top-of-the-line techno-finesse, perhaps the best ever in Tamil cinema" and also wrote that "Technically, [..] a revelation [..] there are stunning visuals, which is paisa vasool. K.V.Anand's cinematography is top class. Art director Thotta Tharani work is enticing, especially the sets in songs". Ananda Vikatan rated the film 41 out of 100.

Accolades 
2007 National Film Awards
 Won – Silver Lotus Award for Best Special Effects – M.S. Indian Artists, Chennai

2008 Filmfare Awards South
 Won – Filmfare Award for Best Music Director – A.R. Rahman
 Won – Filmfare Award for Best Cinematographer – K. V. Anand
 Won – Filmfare Best Art Director Award – Thotta Tharani
 Nominated – Filmfare Award for Best Actor – Rajinikanth
 Nominated – Filmfare Award for Best Film – Sivaji
 Nominated – Filmfare Award for Best Playback Singer Female – Chinmayi

2007 Vijay Awards
 Won – Vijay Award for Favourite Hero – Rajinikanth
 Nominated – Vijay Award for Favourite Heroine – Shriya Saran
 Won – Vijay Award for Best Music Director – A.R. Rahman
 Nominated – Best Playback Singer Female – Chinmayi
 Nominated – Best Playback Singer Male – Udit Narayan

2007 Tamil Nadu State Film Awards
 Won- Tamil Nadu State Film Award for Best Film – First Prize

Legacy 
Sunil, M. S. Bhaskar, and Komal spoofed the character M. G. Ravichandran in  Kantri (2008), Maasilamani (2009), and Thipparalli Tharlegalu (2010), respectively.

Notes

References

Sources

External links 
 
 

2007 action films
2000s Tamil-language films
2007 films
Films scored by A. R. Rahman
Films about corruption in India
Films directed by S. Shankar
Films set in Chennai
Films shot in Andhra Pradesh
Films shot in Maharashtra
Films shot in New York City
Films shot in Spain
AVM Productions films
Indian 3D films
Indian vigilante films
2000s masala films
Films set in New York City
Films shot in Chennai
Indian political films
Indian action films
Films involved in plagiarism controversies
Films that won the Best Special Effects National Film Award
2000s political films